Duncan Cameron may refer to:

Politicians
 Duncan Cameron (Conservative MLA) (1863–1942), politician in Manitoba, Canada
 Duncan Cameron (fur trader) (c. 1764–1848), Canadian fur trader and political figure in Upper Canada
 Duncan Cameron (Liberal MLA) (1865–1948), politician in Manitoba, Canada

Others
 Duncan Cameron (photographer) (1928–1985), Canadian photojournalist
 Duncan Cameron (Scottish inventor) (1825–1901), owner of The Oban Times newspaper and inventor of the "Waverley" nib pen
 Duncan Cameron (shinty player), administrator and ex-player in the sport of shinty
 Duncan Cameron (athlete) (born 1996), Australian runner
 Sir Duncan Cameron (British Army officer) (1808–1888), British general and commander in the New Zealand Land Wars
 Duncan Inglis Cameron (1927–2006), founding secretary of Heriot-Watt University, Edinburgh
Duncan D. Cameron, British microbiologist

See also
 Cameron Duncan (1986–2003), New Zealand writer